Matt Peterson (born April 26, 1967) is an American professional golfer.

Peterson was born in Chicago, Illinois. He played college golf at the University of Georgia where he won one event and was a three-time All-American. He turned professional in 1990.

Peterson played on the Nationwide Tour in  1992, 1994–2001, and 2003–04, winning once at the 1995 Nike Central Georgia Open. He played on the PGA Tour in 2002 where his best finish was T-10 at the 2002 Valero Texas Open.

Peterson is the head professional at the University of Georgia Golf Course in Athens, Georgia.

Professional wins (3)

Nike Tour wins (1)

Other wins (2)
1993 Georgia Open
2007 Georgia PGA Championship

See also
2001 Buy.com Tour graduates

References

External links

American male golfers
Georgia Bulldogs men's golfers
PGA Tour golfers
Korn Ferry Tour graduates
Golfers from Georgia (U.S. state)
Golfers from Chicago
Sportspeople from Athens, Georgia
1967 births
Living people